Herminiimonas saxobsidens is a species of ultramicrobacteria. First reported in 2007, it was isolated from a rock surface colonized with lichens.

References

External links
Type strain of Herminiimonas saxobsidens at BacDive -  the Bacterial Diversity Metadatabase

Burkholderiales